Natalie may refer to:

People 
 Natalie (given name)
 Natalie (singer) (born 1979), Mexican-American R&B singer/songwriter
 Shahan Natalie (1884–1983), Armenian writer and principal organizer of Operation Nemesis

Music

Albums 
 Natalie (Natalie album), by Natalie Alvarado, 2005
 Natalie (Natalie Cole album), 1976

Songs 
 "Natalie" (Ola song), 2006
 "Natalie", by Ada LeAnn, representing Michigan in the American Song Contest, 2022
 "Natalie", by Bruno Mars from Unorthodox Jukebox, 2012
 "Natalie", by Dave Rowland, 1982
 "Natalie", by Freddy Cannon, 1966
 "Natalie", by Rich Dodson, 1980
 "Natalie", by Shirley Bassey from I Am What I Am, 1984
 "Natalie", by Stephen Duffy, 1993

Other uses 
 Natalie (film), a 2010 South Korean film
 Natalie (website), a Japanese entertainment news website

See also
 Natalee, a given name
 Natali (disambiguation)
 Nathalie (disambiguation)